From The Heart is the third studio album released by American country music singer Doug Stone. It was released on August 11, 1992 (see 1992 in country music) on Epic Records Nashville.

This album, certified gold in the U.S., provided Stone with four singles on the Hot Country Songs charts: the Top Five hits "Warning Labels" and "Made for Lovin' You", as well as the Number Ones "Why Didn't I Think of That" and "Too Busy Being in Love". "Made for Lovin' You" was previously recorded by Clinton Gregory on his 1990 debut album Music 'n Me, and by Dan Seals on his 1990 album On Arrival.

Track listing

Personnel
Bobby All – acoustic guitar
Jerry Douglas – Dobro
Paul Franklin – steel guitar, Dobro
Rob Hajacos – fiddle
Owen Hale – drums
Michael Jones – background vocals
Kirk "Jellyroll" Johnson – harmonica 
Blue Miller – electric guitar, background vocals
Mark Morris – percussion
Steve Nathan – keyboards
Mark O'Connor – fiddle
Dave Pomeroy – bass guitar
Brent Rowan – electric guitar
Doug Stone – lead vocals
Biff Watson – acoustic guitar
Willie Weeks – bass guitar
Glenn Worf – bass guitar

Chart performance

References

Allmusic (see infobox)
Liner notes to From the Heart. Epic Records, 1992.

1992 albums
Epic Records albums
Doug Stone albums
Albums produced by Doug Johnson (record producer)